Bronwyn Harch (born Bronwyn Christensen in 1969) is an Australian data scientist.

Early life and education 
Harch comes from a farming family in the rural Lockyer Valley, west of Brisbane.

Career 
She has worked with initiatives with government and industry, predominantly in the environmental and agricultural sectors. These large-scale projects combined statistical expertise with the expertise of scientists from other parts of CSIRO as well as universities, government and industry. The projects were initiated to address environmental issues, for example monitoring the ecological health of waterways in one of Australia's most populous regions, south-east Queensland. At CSIRO, she contributed to statistical design for landscape-scale sampling protocols and monitoring programs, and spatio-temporal statistical modelling of agri-environmental systems. She moved to Queensland University of Technology in 2014 having held senior positions in CSIRO.

References

1969 births
Living people
Australian statisticians
Griffith University alumni
University of Queensland alumni
Academic staff of the University of Queensland
CSIRO people